The 1914 Mississippi A&M Aggies football team represented the Mississippi A&M Aggies of Agricultural and Mechanical College of the State of Mississippi during the 1914 Southern Intercollegiate Athletic Association football season. This is the first season for Davis Wade Stadium. Hunter Kimball was All-Southern.

Schedule

References

Mississippi AandM
Mississippi State Bulldogs football seasons
Mississippi AandM Aggies football